Bussing or busing may refer to:
Student transport by bus
Desegregation busing
Bussing (surname), a surname (including a list of people with the name)
Bussing (setting and clearing tables), the job performed by a busser
Büssing AG, former German bus and truck manufacturer
Pulau Busing (Busing Island), island off the southwestern coast of Singapore

See also
Buss (disambiguation)
Bus (disambiguation)